Rubus mirus is a rare North American species of brambles in the rose family. It has been found in the State of Rhode Island in the northeastern United States.

The genetics of Rubus is extremely complex, so that it is difficult to decide on which groups should be recognized as species. There are many rare species with limited ranges such as this. Further study is suggested to clarify the taxonomy.

References

mirus
Plants described in 1925
Flora of Rhode Island
Flora without expected TNC conservation status